Van Hatfield (born September 13, 1971) is an American professional strongman competitor and powerlifter from Mapleton, Utah. Van won America's Strongest Man in 2004, his career best win. Van came in 2nd at the IFSA Strongman World Team Championships in 2005 with team Pan-America with teammates Travis Ortmayer, Geoff Dolan and Jon Andersen. Van competed in the 2007 IFSA Strongman World Championships, finishing in eighth place.

References

| colspan="3" style="text-align:center;"| America's Strongest Man 
|- 
|  style="width:30%; text-align:center;"| Preceded by:Steve Kirit
|  style="width:40%; text-align:center;"| First (2004)
|  style="width:30%; text-align:center;"| Succeeded by:Steve MacDonald

1971 births
Living people
American powerlifters
American strength athletes
People from Mapleton, Utah